Aurora Rosa Borrello  (3 July 1934 – 15 January 2022), better known as Aurora del Mar, was an Argentine film, television, stage and voice actress.

Life and career 
In the Argentinian capital she became a major radio star, working for all the major radio stations of the time, including LRA Radio Nacional, Radio Belgrano, Radio El Mundo, Radio Excelcior, and Radio Argentina. She made her stage debut alongside Luisa Vehil and  Alejandro Casona in the drama  La casa de los siete balcones, which successfully ran for three years until Borrello had to leave due to a pregnancy. 

Borrello adopted her stage name 'Aurora del Mar' in the early 1950s,  at the suggestion of journalist . She made her film debut in 1953 in La mejor del colegio by Julio Saraceni, and appeared in over 20 films. Starting from the sixties she gradually focused on television. 

Del Mar died in a retirement home in Bernal, on 15 January 2022, at the age of 87. She was a second cousin of footballer José Borello. Her son Claudio is also an actor.

References

External links 
 

1934 births
2022 deaths
Argentine film actresses
Argentine stage actresses
Argentine voice actresses
Argentine television actresses
People from Bahía Blanca